Gaetano Saya (born 24 April 1956) is a former Italian politician and military leader. Saya was captured by the military police on his return from a mission in Iraqi Kurdistan on 13 February 2017  and released on 4 May 2017. He is now the leader of the New MSI, an ultranationalist far-right party. Saya has claimed to have been a member of Gladio, NATO's stay-behind anti-Communist network during the Cold War, involved in Italy's strategy of tension during the "Years of Lead."

In November 2004, Gaetano Saya was charged with hate speech, allegedly broadcast through his party's website. In 2005 he was detained by the Prosecutor of Genoa on charges of having established a "secret parallel police" named D.S.S.A. (Department of Anti-terrorism and Strategic Studies). In 2011, he was found innocent by the Prosecutor of the Court of Milan.

Saya is known for his verbal struggle with many writers and political figures. The last leader of the Italian Social Movement, Gianfranco Fini, has called Gaetano Saya "a madman who uses the MSI logo without rights." Nonetheless, Saya has won all court cases against Gianfranco Fini. At Florence, the Court of Appeal adjudicated his ownership of the MSI logo. His lawyers pressed charges against Fini for slander against Saya over the years. During a well-known Italian radio program, La Zanzara by Giuseppe Cruciani, Saya discussed his case with interviewer David Parenzo. 

In 2017, Saya was arrested again, allegedly due to a political-military conspiracy against him organized by occult powers aimed at stopping his political commitment to the war against Islamic State terrorism. He was released on 4 May 2017.

On 4 April 2019, the Criminal Court of Rome acquitted Saya, represented by lawyer Antonio Gallinaro, from charges pressed by Gianfranco Fini, with the formula "for not having committed the deed." Immediately afterward, Saya pressed charges of slander against Fini, requesting compensation of one million euros.

References 

Italian neo-fascists
Living people
1956 births